This is a bibliography of the works of Wilkie Collins.

Novels
Iolani, or Tahiti as it was. A Romance (written 1844; published 1999)
Antonina (1850)
Basil (1852)
Hide and Seek (1854)
The Dead Secret (1856)
A Rogue's Life (1856/1879)
The Woman in White (1860)
No Name (1862)
Armadale (1866)
The Moonstone (1868)
Man and Wife (1870)
Poor Miss Finch (1872), dedicated to Frances Minto Elliot
The New Magdalen (1873)
The Law and the Lady (1875)
The Two Destinies (1876)
The Fallen Leaves (1879)
Jezebel's Daughter (serialisation 1879–80; 3 vols 1880), novelisation of Collins' play The Red Vial (1858)
The Black Robe (1881)
Heart and Science (1883)
I Say No (1884)
The Evil Genius (1886)
The Guilty River (1886)
The Legacy of Cain (1889)
Blind Love (1890 – unfinished, completed by Walter Besant)

Short fiction
Mr Wray's Cash Box. Or, the Mask and the Mystery. A Christmas sketch (1852)
A Terribly Strange Bed (1852)
Gabriel's Marriage (1853) 
The Ostler (1855)
After Dark (1856)
The Lady of Glenwith Grange (1856)
A House to Let (1858), a short story co-written with Charles Dickens, Elizabeth Gaskell and Adelaide Anne Procter
The Haunted House a short story co-written with Charles Dickens, Elizabeth Gaskell, Adelaide Anne Proctor, George Sala and Hesba Stretton
The Queen of Hearts (1859)
Miss or Mrs? (1873)
The Frozen Deep and Other Stories (1874)
The Frozen Deep
The Dream Woman
John Jago's Ghost; or The Dead Alive
The Haunted Hotel (1878)
My Lady's Money (1879)
Who Killed Zebedee? (1881)
The Ghost's Touch and Other Stories (1885)
Little Novels (1887)
The Queen's Revenge
Mad Monkton
Sights A-Foot
The Stolen Mask
The Yellow Mask
Sister Rose
The Lazy Tour of Two Idle Apprentices (1890)

Non-fiction
Memoirs of the Life of William Collins, Esq., R.A. (1848)  
Rambles Beyond Railways, or, Notes in Cornwall taken a-foot (with illustrations by Henry C. Brandling; 1851)
My Miscellanies (1863)

Plays
The Frozen Deep (1857), co-written with Charles Dickens
The Red Vial (1858)
No Thoroughfare (1867), co-written with Charles Dickens
Black and White (18––)
Miss Gwilt (18––)

Films based on his novels
Basil (UK 1998)
The Woman in White (UK 1997)
The Moonstone (UK 1996)
Zhenshchina v belom (The Woman In White, Russia 1982)
The Woman in White (UK, TV, 5 episodes, 1982)
La donna in bianco (Italy, TV, 1980)
Lucilla (Poor Miss Finch, Germany, 1979, 2 episodes, directed by Wilhelm Semmelroth)
 (The Moonstone, Germany 1974, 2 episodes, directed by Wilhelm Semmelroth)
Great Mysteries (1 Episode: A Terribly Strange Bed, US 1973)
Der rote Schal (Armadale, 3 episodes, directed by Wilhelm Semmelroth)
La pietra di luna (The Moonstone, Italy 1972)
The Moonstone (UK, 5 episodes, 1972)
Die Frau in Weiß (The Woman in White, 3 episodes, Germany 1971, directed by Wilhelm Semmelroth)
The Policeman and the Cook (US 1970)
La femme en blanc (The Woman in White, France 1970)
La dama vestida de blanco (The Woman in White, Spain 1967)
The Woman in White (UK, 6 episodes, 1966)
A Terribly Strange Bed (US 1991)
Dow Hour of Great Mysteries: The Woman in White (US 1960)
The Moonstone (UK, 7 episodes, 1959)
Hour of Mystery: The Woman in White (UK 1957)
Sergeant Cuff kann den Mondstein nicht finden (The Moonstone, Germany 1955)
Suspense: The Moonstone (US 1954)
Tales Of Adventure: The Moonstone (US 1952, 5 episodes)
Robert Montgomery Presents: The Moonstone (US 1952)
The Woman in White (US 1948)
Crimes at the Dark House (based on The Woman in White, US 1940)
The Moonstone (1934)
The Woman in White (1929)
She Loves and Lies (1920)
The Twin Pawns (1919)
The Woman in White (1917)
Tangled Lives (1917)
The Moonstone (1915)
The Quest of the Sacred Jewel (1914)
The New Magdalen (1914
The Dream Woman (1914)
The New Magdalen (1912)
The Woman in White (1912)
The New Magdalene (1910)

References

Bibliographies by writer
Bibliographies of British writers